The 2015 Texas Southern Tigers football team represented Texas Southern University in the 2015 NCAA Division I FCS football season. The Tigers were led by fourth-year head coach Darrell Asberry and played their home games at a BBVA Compass Stadium. They were a member of the West Division of the Southwestern Athletic Conference (SWAC). They finished the season 3–7, 2–7 in SWAC play to finish in fourth place in the West Division.

On November 29, Ashberry resigned. He finished at Texas Southern with a four-year record of 12–31.

Schedule

 * Games will air on a tape delayed basis
± College of Faith didn't meet NCAA accreditation guidelines and all stats and records from this game do not count.
This game was cancelled.

References

Texas Southern
Texas Southern Tigers football seasons
Texas Southern Tigers football